Lieutenant General Pasquale Preziosa (born 21 March 1953) is a retired Italian Air Force officer, who served as Chief of the Italian Air Force.

He joined the Air Force in 1971 and qualified as a pilot.

From August 2003 to September 2006 he served as the Defense Attaché at the Embassy of Italy, Washington, D.C., and Chief of the Cabinet of the Minister of Defence from December 2011 to February 2013. He was appointed Chief of the Air Force in 2013.

References

1953 births
Living people
People from Rovereto
Knights Grand Cross of the Order of Merit of the Italian Republic
Italian Air Force generals
Aeronautica Militare chiefs of staff
21st-century Italian military personnel
20th-century Italian military personnel
Italian air attachés